Isenburg is a municipality in the district of Neuwied, in Rhineland-Palatinate, Germany.

The castle was built by the Counts of Isenburg around 1100 if not prior. Occupied by several branches of the Isenburg family (as a Ganerbenburg), it was inhabited into the early 17th century. Shortly after being abandoned, it became a ruin. After the branch of Lower Isenburg had extinguished in 1664 with count Ernst of Isenburg-Grenzau, the county was partitioned between the counts of Walderdorff and the counts of Wied-Neuwied. The present owner of the castle is Maximilian, 9th Prince of Wied, son of Carl, 8th Prince of Wied and Princess Isabelle of Isenburg.

References

Neuwied (district)